Turbonilla abrupta, common name the abrupt turbonilla,  is a species of sea snail, a marine gastropod mollusk in the family Pyramidellidae, the pyrams and their allies.

Description
The rather stout shell is of  moderate  size, measuring 4 mm, and irregularly coiled. Its color is dead  white. The  small protoconch is transverse to the  axis, with projecting whorls. The teleoconch contains nine flattened whorls. The first 3 or 4 of these enlarge quite abruptly, while below the increase is very gradual. The suture is deep and nearly straight. The transverse ribs number about 20. They are rounded, oblique, and nearly  straight. They are separated by wider, deep, flat-bottomed spaces which terminate just above the suture in very square-cut  ends. The base of the shell is well-rounded and smooth. The aperture is somewhat elongated, expanded below with rounded angles. The thin inner-lip is reflected.

Distribution
This marine species occurs in the following locations:
 Caribbean Sea: Colombia, Mexico
 Puerto Rico
 Gulf of Mexico
 Lesser Antilles; Virgin Islands

References

 Clessin, S. 1900. Die Familie der Eulimidae. Systematisches Conchylien-Cabinet 1(28) 41-224, pl. 10-36
 Bisby, F.A., M.A. Ruggiero, K.L. Wilson, M. Cachuela-Palacio, S.W. Kimani, Y.R. Roskov, A. Soulier-Perkins and J. van Hertum 2005 Species 2000 & ITIS Catalogue of Life: 2005 Annual Checklist. CD-ROM; Species 2000: Reading, U.K.

External links
 To Biodiversity Heritage Library (4 publications)
 To Encyclopedia of Life
 To USNM Invertebrate Zoology Mollusca Collection
 To ITIS
 To World Register of Marine Species

abrupta
Gastropods described in 1899